The tragic mulatto is a stereotypical fictional character that appeared in American literature during the 19th and 20th centuries, starting in 1837. The "tragic mulatto" is a stereotypical mixed-race person (a "mulatto"), who is assumed to be depressed, or even suicidal, because they fail to completely fit in the "white world" or the "black world". As such, the "tragic mulatto" is depicted as the victim of the society that is divided by race, where there is no place for one who is neither completely "black" nor "white".

Tragic mulatta

The female "tragic octoroon" was a stock character of abolitionist literature: a light-skinned woman, raised in her father's household as though she were white, until his bankruptcy or death has her reduced to a menial position and sold. She may even be unaware of her status before being so reduced. This character allowed abolitionists to draw attention to the sexual exploitation in slavery; and unlike the suffering of the field hands, did not allow slaveholders to retort that the sufferings of Northern mill hands were no easier, since the Northern mill owner would not sell his own children into slavery.

The "tragic mulatta" figure is a woman of biracial heritage who endures the hardships of Africans in the Antebellum South, even though she may look white enough that her ethnicity is not immediately obvious. As the name implies, tragic mulattas almost always meet a bad end. Lydia Maria Child's 1842 short story "The Quadroons" is generally credited as the first work of literature to feature a tragic mulatta, to garner support for emancipation and equal rights. Child followed up "The Quadroons" with the 1843 short story "Slavery's Pleasant Homes", which also features a tragic mulatta character.

Writer Eva Allegra Raimon notes that Child "allowed white readers to identify with the victim by gender while distancing themselves by race and thus to avoid confronting a racial ideology that denies the full humanity of nonwhite women." The passing character, Clare Kendry, in Nella Larsen's Passing has been deemed a "tragic mulatta".

Generally, the tragic mulatta archetype falls into one of three categories:

 A woman who can "pass" for white attempts to do so, is accepted as white by society and falls in love with a white man. Eventually, her status as a bi-racial person is revealed and the story ends in tragedy.
 A woman who appears to be white and thus passes as being so. It is believed that she is of Greek or Spanish descent. She has suffered little hardship in her life, but upon the revelation that she is mixed race, loses her social standing.
 A woman who has all the social graces that come along with being a middle-class or upper-class white woman is nonetheless subjected to slavery.

A common objection to this character is that she allows readers to pity the plight of oppressed or enslaved races, but only through a veil of whiteness—that is, instead of sympathizing with a true racial "other", one is sympathizing with a character who is made as much like one's own race as possible.

In popular culture

Literature featuring "tragic mulatto" and "tragic mulatta" characters in pivotal roles
Le Mulâtre 1837 (French)
Sab by Gertrudis Gomez de Avellaneda, 1841. 
The Quadroons, 1842 short story by Lydia Maria Child (introduced the literary character of the tragic mulatto)
Slavery's Pleasant Homes, 1843 short story by Lydia Maria Child
Uncle Tom's Cabin; or, Life Among the Lowly, 1852 novel by Harriet Beecher Stowe (published serially 1851–1852)
Clotel; or, The President's Daughter, 1853 novel by William Wells Brown
The Garies and Their Friends, 1857 novel by Frank J. Webb
The Octoroon (Life in Louisiana) 1859 play, by Dion Bocicault
 A Escrava Isaura, 1875 novel by Brazilian author Bernardo Guimarães
 Iola Leroy, 1892 novel by Frances Harper
Désirée's Baby, 1893 short story by Kate Chopin
 Pudd'nhead Wilson, 1894 novel by Mark Twain
The Wife of His Youth and Other Stories of the Color-Line by Charles W. Chesnutt (1899)
The House Behind the Cedars, 1900 novel by Charles W. Chesnutt
"Talma Gordon," 1900 short story by Pauline Hopkins
The Marrow of Tradition, 1901 novel by Charles W. Chesnutt
The Clansman, 1905 novel by Thomas Dixon, Jr. (the source material for D.W. Griffith's The Birth of a Nation).
Summer, novel by Edith Wharton published in 1917
"Cross", poem by Langston Hughes published 1925
Show Boat, 1926 novel by Edna Ferber (also the source material for the 1927 stage musical).
"Mulatto", poem by Langston Hughes published 1927
The White Girl, 1929 novel by Vara Caspary
Passing, 1929 novel by Nella Larsen
Dark Lustre, 1932 novel by Geoffrey Barnes
Light in August, 1932 novel by William Faulkner 
Imitation of Life, 1933 novel by Fannie Hurst (source material for the 1934 film and its 1959 remake)
"Father and Son", short story by Langston Hughes published 1934
Mulatto: A Play of the Deep South, 1935 play by Langston Hughes 
Lost Boundaries, 1940 book by William L. White
The Wind From Nowhere, 1943 novel by Oscar Micheaux 
The Barrier, 1950 opera by Langston Hughes and Jan Meyerowitz
African Morning, 1952 short story by Langston Hughes
Band of Angels, 1955 novel by Robert Penn Warren
To Kill a Mockingbird, 1960 novel by Harper Lee
A Soldier's Play, 1981 play by Charles Fuller
Devil in a Blue Dress, 1990 novel by Walter Mosley
The Human Stain, 2000 novel by Philip Roth
Island Beneath the Sea, 2009 novel by Isabel Allende
The Vanishing Half, 2020 novel by Britt Bennett

Films featuring "tragic mulatto" and "tragic mulatta" characters in pivotal roles
The Birth of a Nation (1915)
Within Our Gates (1920)
The Symbol of the Unconquered (1920)
The Virgin of the Seminole (1922)
Scar of Shame (1926)
The House Behind the Cedars (1927)
Veiled Aristocrats (1932)
Imitation of Life (1934)
Ouanga (1936)
God's Step Children (1938)
The Betrayal (1948)
Angelitos negros, 1948
Lost Boundaries, 1949
Pinky (1949)
Il Mulatto, 1950 Italian film released as "Angelo" in the United States 
Show Boat (1951)
Band of Angels (1957)
Kings Go Forth (1957)
Imitation of Life (1959), remake of the 1934 original (with nonminor changes)
Shadows (1959)
I Passed for White (1960) 
Flaming Star (1961)
The Black Klansman (1966), a.k.a. I Crossed the Color Line
Angelitos negros (1970), remake of the 1948 original
A Soldier's Story (1984)
Devil in a Blue Dress (1995) 
The Human Stain (2003)
Passing (2021)

Television movies and series featuring "tragic mulatto" and "tragic mulatta" characters in pivotal roles 

 Alex Haley's Queen, the acclaimed television series by Alex Haley, offers a subversion of the "tragic mulatta" archetype, while making reference to many of its elements.
 A Escrava Isaura has been adapted to Brazilian television twice, first in 1976 (as Escrava Isaura), and again in 2004.
 Angel (the television series) featured a tragic mulatta character (portrayed by Melissa Marsala) in its 2000 episode "Are You Now or Have You Ever Been".
 The television series, Quincy, M.E. included an episode, entitled, "passing," that subverts the tragic mulatta trope. A female character raised to believe she is white learns that her deceased father was passing all the time she knew him and that she has been mixed-race all of her life. Instead of viewing the news as tragic, she ends the episode saying, "Black is beautiful."

Folktales
 Haunting of the Octoroon Mistress, a ghost story featuring the institution of octoroon balls.

Video games featuring "tragic mulatta" characters in pivotal roles 
 Assassin's Creed: Liberation, the first PlayStation Vita installment of the Assassin's Creed series, has the playable character, Aveline, subvert the trope, according to Kotaku writer Evan Narcisse.

Music
 The 1973 song "Half-Breed" by Cher tells the story of a child rejected by both white and Cherokee society. Although Cher appeared on the single's artwork in a native headdress, and her mother Georgia Holt at one time claimed Cherokee ancestry, her dark hair and complexion instead came from her Armenian father.

See also
Biracial identity development
Good hair (phrase)
La belle juive
Mary Mildred Williams
Melungeon
Miscegenation
Multi-Facial
One-drop rule
Passing (racial identity)
White slave propaganda

References

Sources 
 

Mulatto
Multiracial affairs
Multiracial literature
Stock characters
Ethnic and racial stereotypes in the United States
Antebellum South